Zonitoides excavatus is a European species of small, air-breathing land snail, a terrestrial pulmonate gastropod mollusk in the family Gastrodontidae.

Distribution
Distribution of Zonitoides excavatus include:

 British Isles: Great Britain and Ireland. In Britain it restricted to a few regions, but frequent in the zones where it occurs (Cornwall, south of London, west Wales, Eastern, southwest and northwest Ireland, specifically Portman, Clonee, Clonakilty and Clare island, central England, southwest Scotland).
 On the redlist in Ireland of species under threat, Endangered in Germany (2009).
 Netherlands
 Denmark
 Belgium
 northern France.

Description 
Zonitoides excavatus is smaller than Zonitoides nitidus. The umbilicus is extremely wide and perspectivically open (as is the case in Discus rotundatus). The shell is weakly brown, slightly transparent, with radial streaks. The animal is dark.

The width of the shell is 5.3–6 mm, and the height of the shell is 2.8-3.4 mm.

Ecology 
Zonitoides excavatus  lives in leaf litter and under dead wood in old natural forests, sometimes also in swamps (western Ireland and western Great Britain). It lives only on non-calcareous soils. It tolerates some degree of human disturbance and replanting, but usually not in forest plantations.

References
This article incorporates public domain text from the reference.

External links
 shell image

Gastrodontidae
Gastropods described in 1830